Häme (Swedish: Tavastland, Latin: Tavastia) is the name of a geographical region in Finland, associated with the Tavastians, or Häme people (hämäläiset), a subgroup of the Finnish people. The precise area referred to can vary depending on the context.

Contemporary contexts 

 Häme, an often vaguely defined area in Southern Finland associated with the Tavastians; the most prominent regions of contemporary Häme are:
Tavastia Proper (Kanta-Häme)
 Päijänne Tavastia (Päijät-Häme)
 Pirkanmaa, (historically, most of this area belonged to Satakunta, but today it is strongly associated with Häme)
 Central Finland (historically, most of this area unambiguously belonged to Tavastia, or Häme, but today the association is weaker)
 Place names including the element Häme in its genitive form Hämeen:
 Hämeenkatu, the main street of Tampere; streets bearing the same name can be found elsewhere in Finland as well
 Hämeenkyrö, a municipality in Pirkanmaa
 Hämeenlinna, the administrative centre of Tavastia Proper
 Hämeen linna, or Häme Castle, a medieval castle in Hämeenlinna, after which the city has been named
 Hämeentie, the longest street in Helsinki; streets bearing the same name can be found elsewhere in Finland as well

Historical contexts 

 Tavastia (historical province) (Häme), a historical province within the Swedish realm from around the 13th century until 1809 and later one of the historical provinces of Finland
 County of Nyland and Tavastehus (Uudenmaan ja Hämeen lääni), 1634–1809, roughly a combination of the historical provinces of Tavastia and Uusimaa
 Governorate of Nyland-Tavastehus (Uudenmaan ja Hämeen lääni), 1809–1831, the continuation of the preceding administrative entity within the Grand Duchy of Finland
 Governorate of Tavastehus (Hämeen lääni), 1831–1917, split off again from the Governorate of Nyland-Tavastehus
 Häme Province (Hämeen lääni), 1917–1997, the continuation of the preceding administrative entity within the independent Finland
 the provinces of Finland into which the regions of the Häme Province were merged in 1997:
 Southern Finland (1997–2009)
 Western Finland (1997–2009)

See also 

 The Tavastian dialects, or Häme dialects (hämäläismurteet), of the Finnish language
 Häme Regiment, a unit of the Finnish Army located in Lahti

References 

Geography of Kanta-Häme